Logan County (formerly Sarber County) is a county located in the U.S. state of Arkansas. As of the 2020 census, the population was 21,131.  Its two county seats are Booneville and Paris.

History
The Arkansas General Assembly defined the state's 64th county on March 22, 1871, incorporating parts of Scott, Yell, and Pope counties (later adding part of Franklin County). They named it Sarber County for John Newton Sarber (1837–1905), an attorney and  Republican state senator from Yell County. He had introduced the resolution to organize the county. Born and reared in Pittsburgh, Pennsylvania, he had moved with his widowed father and family to Kansas in 1855. Sarber became influential in the Arkansas legislature, introducing bills to establish a public school system for the first time, and what developed as the University of Arkansas. In 1873, Sarber was appointed U.S. marshal of the U.S. Western District Court at Fort Smith.

Conservative white Democrats viewed Sarber as a carpetbagger because he was a Union Army veteran who had decided to settle in Arkansas. There he had married Susan Rebecca Rose in 1867. She was the daughter of Moreau Rose, an early pioneer and a Confederate supporter, and his wife. The Sarber couple had six children together; five survived to adulthood.

After white Democrats regained control of the state legislature in 1875, they renamed Sarber County for James Logan (1792-1859), a Kentucky-born early settler in the area who had served in the territorial legislature, from Crawford County, and the first state legislature, from Scott County (part of the latter was absorbed into Logan County).

Geography

Major highways
 Highway 10
 Highway 22
 Highway 23
 Highway 60
 Highway 309

Adjacent counties
Johnson County (north)
Pope County (northeast)
Yell County (southeast)
Scott County (south)
Sebastian County (west)
Franklin County (northwest)

Demographics

2020 census

As of the 2020 United States census, there were 21,131 people, 8,417 households, and 5,839 families residing in the county.

2000 census
As of the 2000 census, there were 22,486 people, 8,693 households, and 6,302 families residing in the county. The racial makeup of the county was 96.46% White, 1.05% Black or African American, 0.65% Native American, 0.15% Asian, 0.02% Pacific Islander, 0.39% from other races, and 1.28% from two or more races. 1.21% of the population were Hispanic or Latino of any race.

There were 8,693 households, out of which 32.90% had children under the age of 18 living with them, 58.70% were married couples living together, 10.10% had a female householder with no husband present, and 27.50% were non-families. 24.40% of all households were made up of individuals, and 12.50% had someone living alone who was 65 years of age or older. The average household size was 2.53 and the average family size was 3.00.

In the county, the population was spread out, with 25.90% under the age of 18, 7.50% from 18 to 24, 26.70% from 25 to 44, 23.90% from 45 to 64, and 16.00% who were 65 years of age or older. The median age was 38 years. For every 100 females there were 98.40 males. For every 100 females age 18 and over, there were 94.20 males.

The median income for a household in the county was $28,344, and the median income for a family was $33,732. Males had a median income of $24,472 versus $18,681 for females. The per capita income for the county was $14,527. About 11.40% of families and 15.40% of the population were below the poverty line, including 18.20% of those under age 18 and 19.60% of those age 65 or over.

Politics
Over the past few election cycles, Logan County has trended heavily towards the GOP. The last Democrat (as of 2020) to carry this county was Bill Clinton in 1996.

Communities

Cities
Booneville (county seat)
Magazine
Paris (county seat)
Ratcliff
Scranton

Towns
Blue Mountain
Caulksville
Morrison Bluff
Subiaco

Census-designated place
New Blaine

Unincorporated communities
Carolan
Prairie View

Townships

 Barber
 Blue Mountain (Blue Mountain)
 Boone (Booneville)
 Cane Creek
 Cauthron
 Clark (Subiaco)
 Delaware
 Driggs
 Ellsworth
 Johnson
 Logan
 Mountain
 Petit Jean
 Reveilee (Magazine)
 River (Morrison Bluff, Scranton)
 Roseville
 Shoal Creek (CDP New Blaine)
 Short Mountain (Paris)
 Six Mile (Caulksville, Ratcliff)
 Sugar Creek
 Tomlinson
 Washburn

Notable residents
Katharine Anthony, American biographer
James Bridges, born in Paris, Arkansas, screenwriter and film director
Dizzy Dean, born in Lucas, Arkansas, major league baseball player
Paul Dean, born in Lucas, Arkansas, brother of Dizzy Dean and major league baseball player
Jon Eubanks, Republican member of the Arkansas House of Representatives from Paris, Arkansas; a farmer and Certified Public Accountant
General John P. McConnell, Chief of Staff, USAF
Robert Johnson, lived in Lucas, Arkansas, at the time of the 1920 census. Renowned Bluesman.

See also
 List of lakes in Logan County, Arkansas
 National Register of Historic Places listings in Logan County, Arkansas

References

Further reading
DeBlack, Thomas A. With Fire and Sword: Arkansas, 1861–1874. Fayetteville: University of Arkansas Press, 2003.
Hodges, Mary Frances. John Newton Sarber and Sarber County, Arkansas. Bloomington, IN: AuthorHouse, 2009. (self-published) 
Moneyhon, Carl H. The Impact of the Civil War and Reconstruction on Arkansas. Baton Rouge: Louisiana University Press, 1994.

 
1871 establishments in Arkansas
Populated places established in 1871